K. K. Haridas (7 September 1965 – 26 August 2018) was an Indian film director in Malayalam cinema. His best known works are Vadhu Doctoranu, Kakkakum Poochakkum Kalyanam and Kinnam Katta Kallan.

Life
Haridas was born to Kunjukunju and Sarojini in Mylapra village in Pathanamthitta district, Kerala, India. Haridas was married to Anitha and the couple have two children—Haritha and Suryadas. Music composer Kannur Rajan is his brother-in-law. Haridas died on 26 August 2018 (aged 52) at a hospital in Kochi due to cardiac arrest.

Partial filmography

References

External links

Malayalam film directors
1965 births
2018 deaths
Film directors from Thiruvananthapuram
20th-century Indian film directors
21st-century Indian film directors